Huch'uy Sara Sara (Quechua huch'uy little, Sara Sara the name of a mountain near Huch'uy Sara Sara, "little Sara Sara", also spelled Uchuy Sara Sara) is a  mountain in the Wansu mountain range in the Andes of Peru. It is situated in the Apurímac Region, Antabamba Province, in the districts of Antabamba and Juan Espinoza Medrano. Huch'uy Sara Sara lies south of Quri Waraqa and north of Sara Sara.

References 

Mountains of Peru
Mountains of Apurímac Region